Red Scaffold is an unincorporated community in Ziebach County, in the U.S. state of South Dakota.

History
A post office called Red Scaffold was established in 1938, and remained in operation until 1943. The community was named after Red Scaffold Creek.

References

Unincorporated communities in Ziebach County, South Dakota
Unincorporated communities in South Dakota